Figuration may refer to:

 In classical music, the use of repetitive patterns; see Figure
 Figurative art, artwork that is derived from real object sources
 Figure (disambiguation)